Hrœrekr Ringslinger or Ringscatterer, Old Norse: Hrærekr slöngvanbaugi, Old Danish: Rørik Slængeborræ or Rørik Slyngebond was a legendary 7th-century king of Zealand or Denmark, who appears in Chronicon Lethrense, Annals of Lund, Gesta Danorum, Sögubrot, Njáls saga, Hversu Noregr byggðist, Skjöldunga saga, and Bjarkarímur. Connection with such historical figures such as Horik I, who ruled Denmark around 854 for a dozen or so years, or the founder of the Rurik dynasty is fraught with difficulty.

Beside the name, the Danish and the West Norse traditions have little more in common than his living a few generations after Hrólfr Kraki, his name and his title. In the Danish tradition, he is described as the grandfather of Prince Hamlet.

Name
The name Slængeborræ, in Chronicon lethrense and the Annals of Lund is a corruption of Slænganbøghe, which is the Old East Norse form of Old West Norse slöngvanbaugi meaning "ring slinger", i.e. a king who was generous with his gold. Saxo's version Slyngebond means "bracelet slinger" and the motivation Saxo gives is strikingly different (see below).

Danish tradition
In the Danish tradition Rørik is the son of an earthly Höðr, and notably the grandfather of Prince Hamlet through his mother Gertrude. Rørik is described as a powerful king of Denmark.

Chronicon lethrense and Annals of Lund
The Chronicon lethrense and the Annals of Lund make Rørik the son of an earthly Höðr who killed Balder, Odin's son in battle. Höðr was himself killed by Odin's son Both.

Rørik Slængeborræ was a victorious king who conquered Courland, Wendland and Sweden and made them pay tribute to him. He appointed Orwendel and Feng as the commanders of Jutland and gave his sister to Orwendel. The sister and Orwendel were the parents of Amblothe (Hamlet). Rørik was succeeded by Wighlek.

Gesta Danorum
The Gesta Danorum (book 3) by Saxo Grammaticus agrees with the Chronicon lethrense and the Annals of Lund by making Rørik Slyngebond the son of Höðr (Høther). When Odin's son Boe had killed Höðr, the Swedes, the Curonians and the Slavs rebelled against Denmark (Saxo patriotically ignores the fact that he had previously given Höðr as a prince of Sweden who ruled Denmark) and attacked Rørik.

When the Slavic and Danish forces met, a Slavic wizard suggested that instead of having a large battle and lose a great many lives, two men should meet in a duel. If the Slav won, the tribute would be cancelled, but if the Dane won, the tribute would be paid as in the old days. A Dane asked Rørik what the reward would be for the Danish champion if he won the fight. Rørik promised a chain of six laced bracelets. The Dane entered the duel but was defeated and died.

The next day, the winning Slavic champion was emboldened by his victory and asked if there was a second Dane who wanted to meet him in combat. A warrior named Ubbe who was both strong and skilled in seiðr asked Rørik what the prize would be if he killed the Slav. Once again Rørik promised the chain of bracelets. The Dane asked Rørik if he would leave the chain of bracelets to a third trustworthy man, so that he could not change his mind when the Danish champion had won. Rørik agreed, but the man who would take the chain was on another ship, and when Rørik threw the chain of bracelets across, he underestimated the distance and so the chain fell into the water, and was lost forever. This gave Rørik the cognomen Slyngebond (sling-bracelets). However, Ubbe decided to take the challenge anyway. In the duel both champions died, but the Slavs were impressed and agreed to continue paying the tribute.

Rørik appointed Horwendil and Feng as the rulers of Jutland. Horwendil spent a great deal of time pillaging and won so much fame that Rørik gave him his daughter Gerutha (Gertrude) who bore him the son Amleth (Hamlet).

When Rørik died, he was succeeded by Wiglek.

Skjôldunga saga

Here, Rørik is the son of Ingjald Frodason (Ingeld), and the half brother of king Halfdan in Lejre, the father of Hroðgar. Ingeld kills Healfdene, and takes his wife as his own. Rørik is the result of this union. The name Slöngvanbaugi is connected to an incident where he threw some rings into the ocean (the ring-slinger).

West Norse tradition
The Norwegian and Icelandic tradition only mentions Hrœrekr in relation to the Scanian chieftain Ivar Vidfamne who made himself the ruler of both Denmark and Sweden. There is no information on his parentage, nor any Hamlet. In these sources, Hrœrekr is only the king of Zealand, Skåne and Jutland being in the hands of other rulers.

Sögubrot
Sögubrot relates that when Ivar Vidfamne was the king of Sweden, he gave his daughter Auðr the Deep-Minded to Hrœrekr, even though she wanted to marry Hrœrekr's brother Helgi the Sharp. Hrœrekr and Auðr then had the son Harald Wartooth. Ivar told Hrærekr that Auðr was unfaithful with his brother Helgi. The ruse worked and Hrœrekr killed his brother, after which Ivar attacked and killed Hrœrekr too. However, Auðr arrived with the Zealand army and chased her father Ivar back to Sweden. The following year, Auðr went to Garðaríki with her son Harald and many powerful men and married its king Raðbarðr. This was the opportunity for Ivar to conquer Zealand. 

Sögubrot adds a second Hrœrekr slöngvanbaugi who was the son of Harald Wartooth, and consequently named after his grandfather.

Njals saga
Njals saga only mentions Hrœrekr Slöngvanbaugi as an ancestor of a man named Valgarðr. It tells that he was the father of Harald Wartooth, and then it states that Harald's mother was Auðr, the daughter of Ivar Vidfamne, the son of Halfdan the Valiant. It does not mention whether Hrœrekr was married to Auðr, but assumes that the reader is familiar with their story.

Hyndluljóð
In the poem Hyndluljóð the goddess Freyja meets the völva Hyndla and they ride together towards Valhalla. Freyja rides on her boar Hildisvíni and Hyndla on a wolf. Their mission is to find out the pedigree of Óttarr so that he can touch his inheritance, and the lay consists mostly of Hyndla reciting a number of names from Óttarr's ancestry, among them Hrærekr's in stanza 28.

Hversu Noregr byggðist
Hversu Noregr byggðist, agrees with Sögubrot by giving Hrœrekr as the father of Harald Wartooth. It also adds that he had the son Randver, the father of the Swedish and Danish king Sigurd Hring. However, other sources disagree with Hversu (Sögubrot and the Lay of Hyndla says that Randver's father was Raðbarðr, whereas Hervarar saga says that it was Valdar).

Notes

External links
 Peter Tunstall's translation of the Chronicon lethrense at The Chronicle of the Kings of Lejre and Northvegr: The Saga of Hrolf Kraki: The Chronicle of the Kings of Lejre.
Book Three of Gesta Danorum at the Medieval and Classical Literature Library
Hyndluljóð Guðni Jónsson's edition with normalized spelling
Hyndluljoth Translation and commentary by Henry A. Bellows
Sacred Texts: Appendix A: Fl. Book 1.21,22: How Norway was inhabited a translation of Hversu Noregr byggðist. (The genealogies of the descendants of Nór and the Ættartolur are not translated here.)
Sögubrot in Old Norse

Mythological kings of Denmark
Scyldings